Vinay Singh is a retired Indian football goalkeeper who last played for then I-League club Mohun Bagan, and is the current goalkeeping coach of RoundGlass Punjab.

Career

Shillong Lajong
After spending two years with Salgaocar Singh signed for Shillong Lajong and made his debut on 22 September 2013 against Dempo at the Duler Stadium; Singh managed to keep the clean-sheet as Shillong Lajong won the match 0–3.

Mohun Bagan
Mohun Bagan signed Singh in 2014 as a substitute keeper.

Career statistics

Club

References

1977 births
Living people
Indian footballers
Churchill Brothers FC Goa players
I-League players
Salgaocar FC players
Shillong Lajong FC players
Association football goalkeepers